Fehérvár Football Club is a professional Hungarian football club based in Székesfehérvár, Hungary.

Managers
  József Albert (1964–65)
  Béla Kárpáti (1967–68)
  Lajos Németh (1968)
  András Turay (1969)
  Imre Kovács (1970–71)
   Géza Kalocsay (01/01/1971–30/06/1972)
  Ferenc Kovács (01/07/1972–30/06/1977)
  Mihály Lantos (1977–80)
  József Verebes (1980–81)
  Antal Szentmihályi (1981–82)
  Ferenc Molnár (1982–83)
  Ferenc Kovács (01/07/1983–30/06/1986)
  József Tajti (1986–87)
  Ferenc Kovács (01/07/1987–30/06/1988)
  Gábor Kaszás (1988–89)
  György Mezey (25/02/1990– 30/06/1990)
  Győző Burcsa (1990–92)
  Gábor Hartyáni (15/07/1992–18/04/1994)
  Emerich Jenei (1993)
  László Kiss (1994)
  Károly Szabó (1994–95)
  Ferenc Csongrádi (1995–96)
  Slobodan Kustudić (1996–97)
  László Disztl (1997)
  József Szabó (1997)
  Attila Vágó (1998)
  Ferenc Csongrádi (1998)
  József Verebes (01/07/1998–30/06/1999)
  János Csank (1999–00)
  Ferenc Csongrádi (2000–01)
  Péter Várhidi (01/07/2001–28/12/2002)
  Bertalan Bicskei (2003)
  János Csank (01/07/2003–30/06/2004)
  Aurél Csertői (23/07/2004–20/10/2006)
  Zoltán Németh (2006)
  Marijan Vlak (22.12.2006–31.12.2007)
  László Disztl (01.07.2008–16.08.2008)
  István Varga (20 August 2008–29 May 2009)
  László Disztl (2009)
  György Mezey (01 July 2009–01.06.2011)
  Paulo Sousa (01 June 2011–07.01.2013)
  José Gomes (20.01.2013–02.06.2014)
  Joan Carrillo (06 June 2014–03 June 2015)
  Bernard Casoni (11 June 2015–19 August 2015)
  Tamás Pető (19 August 2015–06 October 2015) caretaker
  Ferenc Horváth (06 October 2015–01 May 2016)
  Henning Berg (05 May 2016–3 June 2017)
  Marko Nikolić (3 June 2017 – 25 November 2019)
  Joan Carrillo (25 November 2019 - 6 July 2020)
  Gábor Márton (8 July 2020-17 February 2021)
 Tamás Szalai (interim)
 Imre Szabics (1 April 2021–16 February 2022)
 Michael Boris (16 February 2022–17 October 2022)
 Szabolcs Huszti (17 October 2022–14 March 2023)

References

External links

 
Videoton